Ictonychinae is a subfamily of the mammal family Mustelidae found mainly in the Neotropics (three species) and Africa (three species), with one Eurasian member. It includes the grisons, Patagonian weasel, striped polecats, African striped weasel, and marbled polecat. These genera were formerly included within a paraphyletic definition of the mustelid subfamily Mustelinae.

Most members have a mask-like bar or larger dark marking across their faces; the African representatives of the group are striped. A defense mechanism common to the group is use of a chemical spray similar to (but not necessarily as strong as) that of skunks.

Species

Subfamily Ictonychinae

Fossil genera

Cernictis
Enhydrictis
Martellictis
Lutravus
Oriensictis
Pannonictis
Sminthosinis
Stipanicicia
Trigonictis
Trochictis

References

External links